The cultural and artistic events of Italy during the period 1400 to 1499 are collectively referred to as the  Quattrocento from the Italian word for the number 400, in turn from , which is Italian for the year 1400. The Quattrocento encompasses the artistic styles of the late Middle Ages (most notably International Gothic), the early Renaissance (beginning around 1425), and the start of the High Renaissance, generally asserted to begin between 1495 and 1500.

Historical context
After the decline of the Western Roman Empire in 476, economic disorder and disruption of trade spread across Europe.  This was the beginning of the Early Middle Ages, which lasted roughly until the 14th century, when trade increased, population began to expand and the people regained their authority.

In the late Middle Ages, the political structure of the European continent slowly coalesced from small, turbulent fiefdoms into larger, more stable nation states ruled by monarchies. In Italy, urban centers arose, populated by merchant and trade classes able to defend themselves. Money replaced land as the medium of exchange, and increasing numbers of serfs became freedmen. The changes in Medieval Italy and the decline of feudalism paved the way for social, cultural, and economic changes.

The Quattrocento is viewed as the transition from the Medieval period to the age of the Italian Renaissance, principally in the cities of Rome, Florence, Milan, Venice, Naples. The period saw the fall of Constantinople to the Ottoman Empire, and it has been compared with the Timurid Renaissance which unfolded at the same time in Central Asia.

Development of Quattrocento styles

Quattrocento art shed the decorative mosaics typically associated with Byzantine art along with Christian and Gothic media, as well as styles in stained glass, frescoes, illuminated manuscripts and sculpture. Instead, Quattrocento artists incorporated the more classic forms developed by classical Roman and Greek art.

List of Italian Quattrocento artists
Since the Quattrocento overlaps with part of the Renaissance, it would be inaccurate to say that a particular artist was Quattrocento or Renaissance.  Artists of the time probably would not have identified themselves as members of a school or period.

 Andrea del Castagno
 Andrea del Verrocchio
 Andrea della Robbia
 Andrea Mantegna
 Antonello da Messina
 Antoniazzo Romano
 Antonio del Pollaiuolo
 Antonio Rossellino
 Benozzo Gozzoli
 Bertoldo di Giovanni
 Carlo Crivelli
 Cosimo Tura
 Desiderio da Settignano
 Domenico di Bartolo
 Domenico Ghirlandaio
 Domenico Veneziano
 Donatello
 Ercole de' Roberti
 Filippo Brunelleschi
 Filippo Lippi
 Fra Angelico
 Francesco del Cossa
 Francesco di Giorgio
 Francesco Squarcione
 Gentile Bellini
 Gentile da Fabriano
 Giovanni Bellini
 Giovanni di Paolo
 Jacopo de' Barbari
 Jacopo Bellini
 Justus of Ghent
 Leonardo da Vinci
 Lorenzo Ghiberti
 Luca della Robbia
 Luca Signorelli
 Luciano Laurana
 Masaccio
 Masolino
 Melozzo da Forlì
 Michelangelo di Lodovico Buonarroti Simoni
 Paolo Uccello
 Pedro Berruguete
 Piero della Francesca
 Pietro Perugino
 Sandro Botticelli
 Il Sassetta
 Troso da Monza
 Vecchietta
 Vittore Carpaccio
 Vittore Crivelli

Also see the list of 27 prominent 15th century painters made contemporaneously by Giovanni Santi, Raphael Sanzio's father as part of a poem for the Duke of Urbino.

See also 
Duecento – the 13th century in Italian culture
Trecento – the 14th century in Italian culture
Cinquecento – the 16th century in Italian culture
Seicento – the 17th century in Italian culture
Settecento – the 18th century in Italian culture
Ottocento – the 19th century in Italian culture
Novecento – the 20th century in Italian culture

References

Further reading
 (see table of contents)

External links

.04
.
 
 
Cultural history of Italy
Renaissance art
.
.
.04
.
.
.
.